Khatunabad (also Romanized as Khātūnābād) is a village in Owch Tappeh-ye Gharbi Rural District, Torkamanchay District, Meyaneh County, East Azerbaijan Province, Iran. At the 2006 census, its population was 397, in 78 families.

References 

Populated places in Meyaneh County